Tomislav Žigmanov is a Serbian politician serving as minister of human and minority rights and social dialogue since 2022. An ethnic Croat, he has been the president of the Democratic Alliance of Croats in Vojvodina (DSHV) since 2015. He served in the National Assembly of Serbia from 2016 to 2020, and again from 1 August 2022 to 25 October 2022.

Early life, private career, and community activism
Žigmanov was born the son of Ružica and Kalman Žigmanov, who were a tractor driver and a housewife respectively, in Tavankut, Vojvodina, in what was then the Socialist Republic of Serbia in the Socialist Federal Republic of Yugoslavia (SFRY). He was raised in that community and in nearby Subotica and later graduated from the Faculty of Philosophy, University of Novi Sad. He is a professor of philosophy and has published in the field. He became politically active during the Yugoslav Wars following the breakup of Yugoslavia. Žigmanov was a co-founder of the magazine Žig, which he edited from 1996 to 1998, and worked at Radio Subotica from 1998 until 2002, when he founded the publishing house 'NIU Hrvatska riječ. He now lives in Subotica.

In September 2002, he said that Croat institutions in Vojvodina were operating in "very unfavourable conditions," notwithstanding significantly improved relations with the Serbian state since the fall of Slobodan Milošević's government. He added that initiatives within the Vojvodinian Croat community itself were often undertaken "without consensus or agreement."

Žigmanov launched the Croatian-language paper Hrvatska riječ in January 2003 at a public ceremony at the Assembly of Vojvodina attended by several Vojvodinian politicians and Croatian delegates. He said on this occasion, "We can now again write about social reality and position of Croats in Vojvodina in a truthful and professional manner and in our own tongue." He welcomed the indictment of Serbian Radical Party leader Vojislav Šešelj by the International Criminal Tribunal for the former Yugoslavia (ICTY) the following month, saying that he hoped it would provide consolation to those who suffered at the hands of Šešelj and his followers in the 1990s.

In January 2004, Žigmanov appeared on the television program TV divani on Television Novi Sad and, among other things, implicated the parent Radio Television of Serbia network in recent anti-Croat incidents in Vojvodina. The station refused to run this episode of the program, leading to a dispute between the show's producers and station management. Žigmanov subsequently protested against increased attacks on various minority communities in the Subotica area, including Slovaks and Rusyns, which he blamed on the rise of right-wing forces in the 2004 Vojvodina provincial election. Later in the year, he co-authored a report on the status of ethnic Croats in Serbia for the Helsinki Committee for Human Rights in Serbia; the report stated that "Croats in Vojvodina are not sufficiently involved in decision-making processes, and they are poorly represented in public and state administration, notably in the police, the army, the judiciary, customs administration and state-run companies."

In 2007, he won the Zvane Črnja Award for his book Minimum in maximis – zapisi s ruba o nerubnome.

He criticized the entry of the Socialist Party of Serbia into Vojvodina's coalition government following the 2008 provincial election, saying that, absent a "radical renunciation" of the party's activities in the 1990s, its presence would be a "poke in the eye to people who suffered under the Milošević regime."

In January 2009, Žigmanov became the inaugural director of the Institute for the Culture of Croats in Vojvodina. He was also appointed as the head of a committee to monitor anti-Croat incidents in Vojvodina in July 2011; he indicated that the committee's mandate would include monitoring hate speech directed against the Catholic Church. He later sponsored a comprehensive research project on crimes committed against Vojvodinian Croats in the Yugoslav Wars. In November 2016, he argued that Croat under-representation in state institutions had reached levels not seen since 1990.

In January 2014, he was one of three Croat leaders in Vojvodina to meet with Serbian president Tomislav Nikolić for discussions on the status of Croats in the province.

Žigmanov frequently criticized the government of Croatia for paying insufficient attention to the concerns of Croats in Serbia. He welcomed Croatia's accession to the European Union (EU) in 2013, although he criticized the Croatian government's decision not to invite any representatives of the Vojvodinian Croat community to the ceremony.

Following the ICTY's decision to temporarily release Vojislav Šešelj on health grounds in 2014, Žigmanov said that "Croats in Vojvodina have justified and understandable reasons to be worried" about the Radical Party leader's sudden re-emergence in Serbia. Žigmanov specifically accused Šešelj of having triggered the persecution of Croats in the Srem District in the Yugoslav Wars. On another occasion, he said that twenty-five Croats were killed during this period in the Srem and South Bačka Districts and that more than thirty thousand people were expelled or forced to leave their homes, although he added that these crimes took place under state auspices and that Šešelj was not exclusively responsible.

In March 2015, the mayor of Subotica banned the promotion of two books on the origins of the Bunjevci, on the grounds that the presentation would be political in nature. Žigmanov and fellow Vojvodinian Croat leader Slaven Bačić strongly criticized this decision as discriminatory; a report in the Croatian media described them as speculating that Croats in the city could be forced to wear special badges in the future.

Political career
Žigmanov was the information secretary of Croat National Council in Serbia in the early 2000s. He criticized the governing Democratic Party (Demokratska stranka, DS) for participating in the National Council's 2010 elections, which were intended to be reserved for cultural institutions and organizations.

He co-operated with the DSHV for many years before becoming the party's leader, although he was sometimes critical of the party's decisions. He opposed the DSHV's endorsement of the Croatian Democratic Union (Hrvatska demokratska zajednica, HDZ) in the 2007 Croatian parliamentary election and said that it would be better for Croats in Serbia for the rival Social Democratic Party (Socijaldemokratska partija, SDP) to form the government. This notwithstanding, he joined the DSHV in welcoming the election of HDZ candidate Kolinda Grabar-Kitarović as president of Croatia in 2015, on the grounds that she had promised to devote more time to the concerns of Vojvodinian Croats.

Žigmanov was elected as DSHV president without opposition on 30 October 2015. In his acceptance speech, he said that he would fight for reserved seats for Croats in the assemblies of Serbia and Vojvodina, and for Croatian language and literature departments in Serbia's universities.

Member of the National Assembly of Serbia
The DSHV contested the 2016 Serbian parliamentary election on the electoral list of the Democratic Party. Going into the campaign, Žigmanov said that the party expected to win one seat in the new parliament. This predication was accurate: Žigmanov received the sixteenth position on the list and, as it won sixteen mandates, was duly elected. The election was won by the Serbian Progressive Party and its allies, and Žigmanov serves in opposition as a member in the Democratic Party's parliamentary group.

In December 2016, Žigmanov said that Serbia would need to publish 186 textbooks in Croatian at all education levels as the best means of fulfilling its educational and cultural requirements to join the European Union. He added that this would also be the best way of overturning Croatia's recently imposed blockade on Chapter 26 (Education and Culture) in Serbia's EU entry talks. Shortly thereafter, he welcomed both Serbia's decision to print Croatian textbooks at the primary school level and Croatia's overturning of the block.

Vesna Prćić, the sole DSHV representative in the Assembly of Vojvodina, said in early 2017 that she believed the party should support Progressive Party leader and incumbent Serbian prime minister Aleksandar Vučić in the 2017 Serbian presidential election. Žigmanov indicated his surprise at this statement and said he was certain the party would not follow Prćić's recommendation. The party ultimately decided against supporting any candidate. Notwithstanding this, the party has had a complicated relationship with Vučić and his administration. It congratulated him on his victory in the presidential election and welcomed Croatian president Grabar-Kitarović's decision to attend his inauguration as marking a step toward the normalization of relations between the countries. Žigmanov also welcomed Vučić's state visit to Croatia in February 2018 and was included in the president's delegation. Shortly thereafter, he took part in formal discussions between Vučić and members of Serbia's Croat community, which he later said resulted in an agreement to increase the number of Croatian sections in Subotica's secondary schools.

In late 2017, Žigmanov drew attention to an incident in which three ethnic Croats in Sonta had been attacked as they were leaving a café. He described the incident as an ethnically motivated hate crime. The Vojvodinian police disagreed with this assessment, saying that they had interviewed several witnesses and did not find elements that the fight was motivated by ethnicity. President Vučić subsequently endorsed the police's conclusions, while Croatia called for further investigations. Žigmanov accused the Serbian state of denying that Croats could be targeted for violence.

Žigmanov opposed a bill to reform Serbia's national minority councils in June 2018, saying that it would reduce their autonomy. He particularly opposed a section of the bill that would prevent leaders of national minority parties in Serbia from holding leadership positions on the councils.

He is currently a member of the assembly committee on labour, social issues, social inclusion, and poverty reduction; a deputy member of the committee on human and minority rights and gender equality; and a member of the parliamentary friendship groups with Bosnia and Herzegovina, Croatia, the Holy See, and Poland.

Response to ICTY and MICT verdicts
The 2016 election saw the return to parliament of Radical Party leader Vojislav Šešelj following an absence of thirteen years, most of which he had spent on trial for war crimes at the ICTY. During the assembly campaign, the ICTY unexpectedly acquitted Šešelj of all charges against him. Žigmanov described this as an "unpleasant surprise" for Vojvodinian Croats, saying, "We know what we went through and that is why Šešelj's acquittal is so difficult for us."

The Mechanism for International Criminal Tribunals (MICT), a successor body to the ICTY, subsequently overturned part of Šešelj's acquittal in April 2018 and found him criminally responsible for the persecution and deportation of Vojvodinian Croats by virtue of an inflammatory speech he had delivered in Hrtkovci on 6 May 1992, in which he called for Croats to leave the area. The Radical Party leader was sentenced to ten years in prison, although he was not required to serve any time as he had already spent more than eleven years in custody during the trial period. Žigmanov noted that this was the first time that an international court had recognized crimes committed against Croats in Vojvodina during the Yugoslav Wars and added, "we could say that a little justice has been served."

In the aftermath of the conviction, Šešelj stated that he was "proud" of his actions in 1992 and was "preparing intensively to commit again my war crimes, [starting] with Tomislav Žigmanov and Nenad Čanak." Žigmanov described these comments as "unacceptable" and reminiscent of the climate of Serbian politics in the 1990s. The Croatian government also condemned Šešelj's statements and urged Serbia to take legal action against him. In the absence of an official response to Šešelj's statements by the Serbian government, Žigmanov withdrew from a scheduled appearance with other parliamentarians in welcoming Gordan Jandroković, the Speaker of the Croatian Parliament, to the National Assembly of Serbia. Jandroković referenced this situation during his visit, saying, "statements that could be heard in recent days, which have negative connotations for the Croat minority in Serbia, are unacceptable to us," though he added that he was confident that all issues pertaining to the rights of Croats in Serbia could be resolved successfully. (Jandroković's trip was cut short following an incident on the assembly grounds in which Šešelj trampled on the Croatian flag and cursed at him, yelling another insult at Žigmanov in the process.)

Žigmanov subsequently warned that anti-Croat sentiments were rising in the aftermath of these incidents. He welcomed a decision by Serbian police to prevent the Radical Party from holding a rally in Hrtkovci on the anniversary of Šešelj's 1992 speech, though he added, "the reason why this is happening, the downplaying of events from the 1990s in which Croats were the victims [...] hasn't disappeared."

Šešelj subsequently purchased a house in Hrtkovci, an act that the Serbian media identified as an obvious provocation against the Croat community. Žigmanov told Blic, "his return to the place of suffering of Croats is not only frightful but it largely trivializes the war crimes, which causes disquiet among the local Croats." In response to this statement, senior Radical Party official and parliamentarian Vjerica Radeta again insulted Žigmanov, describing him as an Ustasha.

2020 election
In November 2019, Žigmanov brought the DSHV into a new alliance known as the Vojvodina Front, which also includes the League of Social Democrats of Vojvodina (LSV) and the Vojvodina Party. He subsequently joined the LSV in a new parliamentary group called Vojvodina Front–Serbia 21. He is seeking re-election to the National Assembly in the 2020 Serbian parliamentary election, appearing in the sixth position on the United Democratic Serbia list.

References

1967 births
Living people
Politicians from Subotica
Members of the National Assembly (Serbia)
Members of the Croat National Council (Serbia)
Democratic Alliance of Croats in Vojvodina politicians
Academic staff of the University of Novi Sad
Croats of Vojvodina